Albtransport was Albania's government-owned flag carrier between 1957 to 1991. Throughout its existence, it only sporadically carried out civil flights with the Ilyushin Il-14 of the Albanian Air Force. The state-owned company was primarily responsible for national issues in civil aviation, including air traffic control in Albania and handling at Tirana Airport and its management.

History 
Albtransport was founded on 25 January 1957 to coincide with the inauguration of Tirana Airport. At the same time, the Albanian government acquired its first commercial aircraft, an Ilyushin Il-14, which was used only as a government aircraft. Before that, the country had neither civil aircraft nor did it meet the legal requirements for international scheduled flight operations, because Albania did not join the ICAO until 1989. After its opening, foreign airlines, such as Aeroflot, Jat and Malév, flew to Tirana Airport on schedule, while Albtransport hardly appeared as an airline. Although the company briefly marketed a line connection to Berlin-Schönefeld Airport under its own name in the early 1960s, this route was actually flown in cooperation with Interflug, with Albtransport using only the free capacities on board with the Interflug planes. The Albanian government aircraft was used only sporadically on national and international special flights, including to Bucharest, Moscow, Prague and Sofia.

Three other used Ilyushin Il-14s, including one licensed from East Germany and one from Czechoslovakia, were acquired by the Albanian Air Force in 1971. This also used Albtransport for occasional passenger and cargo flights inland. In 1991, the company also briefly operated a Bell 222UT helicopter for the Albanian government. Towards the end of 1991, Albtransport ceased operations as an airline, but was not dissolved. At the beginning of 1992, the state-owned company founded the airline Albanian Airlines in the form of a joint venture with the Austrian airline Tyrolean Airways. After the country's democratization, Albtransport was responsible for civil air traffic control in Albania until the end of 1992 and remained the state operating company of Tirana Airport until the end of 2004.

References

Defunct airlines of Albania
Airlines established in 1957
Airlines disestablished in 2004
1957 establishments in Albania
2004 disestablishments in Albania